Mount Logan is the highest mountain in Canada.

Mount Logan may also refer to:

Canada
Mount Logan (Quebec)

United States
Mount Logan (Arizona), a mountain of Arizona by height
Mount Logan (Garfield County, Colorado)
Mount Logan Foothills, an Area of Critical Environmental Concern in Colorado
Mount Logan (Montana)
Mount Logan (Ohio), depicted on the Seal of Ohio
Logan Peak, or Mount Logan, Utah
Mount Logan (Washington)
Mount Logan Wilderness, Arizona

See also
Logan Glacier (Alaska)
Logan (disambiguation)